Belotecan is a drug used in chemotherapy. It is a semi-synthetic camptothecin analogue indicated for small-cell lung cancer and ovarian cancer, approved in South Korea under the trade name Camtobell, presented in 2 mg vials for injection. The drug has been marketed by ChongKunDang Pharmaceuticals since 2003.

Mechanism of action
Belotecan blocks topoisomerase I with a pIC50 of 6.56, stabilizing the cleavable complex of topoisomerase I-DNA, which inhibits the religation of single-stranded DNA breaks generated by topoisomerase I; lethal double-stranded DNA breaks occur when the topoisomerase I-DNA complex is encountered by the DNA replication machinery, DNA replication is disrupted, and the tumor cell undergoes apoptosis. Topoisomerase I is an enzyme that mediates reversible single-strand breaks in DNA during DNA replication.

References 

Topoisomerase inhibitors
Delta-lactams
Delta-lactones
Nitrogen heterocycles
Oxygen heterocycles
Heterocyclic compounds with 5 rings
Isopropylamino compounds